Lecanora luteomarginata is a species of saxicolous (rock-dwelling) and crustose lichen in the family Lecanoraceae. Found in India, it was formally described as a new species in 2006 by Sanjeeva Nayaka, Dalip Kumar Upreti, and H. Thorsten Lumbsch. It is only known from the type locality. Characteristics of the lichen include its thin, smooth thallus, dark brown apothecia with bright yellow margins, melacarpella-type amphithecia and glabrata-type epihymenia. The specific epithet luteomarginata refers to the yellow-coloured apothecial margins. Secondary compounds in the lichen include arthothelin, atranorin, chloroatranorin, and thiophanic acid.

See also
List of Lecanora species

References

luteomarginata
Lichen species
Lichens described in 2006
Lichens of India
Taxa named by Dalip Kumar Upreti
Taxa named by Helge Thorsten Lumbsch